Archie Jones is an American former Negro league second baseman who played in the 1940s.

Jones played for the Philadelphia Stars in 1940 and 1941. In 11 recorded games, he posted three hits in 28 plate appearances.

References

External links
 and Seamheads

Year of birth missing
Place of birth missing
Philadelphia Stars players